Anna Marie Villaraza-Suarez is a Filipina politician who serve as Member of the Philippine House of Representatives for ALONA Partylist since June 30, 2016.

Political career 

In 2015 she filed her certificate of candidacy (COC) for ALONA Partylist and became the 1st nominee for the 2016 House elections and again in 2019 and 2022, and now she was in her 3rd and final term.

References 

Living people
Members of the House of Representatives of the Philippines
Women members of the House of Representatives of the Philippines
Party-list members of the House of Representatives of the Philippines
Year of birth missing (living people)